...Into the Exam Room is the third studio album from U.S. stoner rock group Hermano. The LP was released in Europe on October 22, 2007, and early 2008 in North America.

Track listing

Personnel

Band
 John Garcia – vocals
 David Angstrom – guitar
 Mike Callahan – guitar
 Dandy Brown – bass
 Chris Leathers – drums

Additional personnel
 Steve Feldman – additional vocals on all tracks except "Hard Working Wall" and "At the Bar"
 Robbie Waldman – vocals on "Hard Working Wall" and "At the Bar"
 Evan Angstrom – talk box on "Exam Room", vocals on "Letters from Madrid"
 Audrey Angstrom – vocals on "Letters from Madrid"

References

Hermano (band) albums
2007 albums